Lokugamage Gayantha Ganadesha Karunatileka, MP (born 21 August 1962) is a Sri Lankan politician. He formerly served as a Cabinet Minister of Lands and Parliament affairs, Chief Government Whip and Member of Parliament. A member of the United National Party (UNP), he is the UNP Media Secretary and act as the cabinet spokesman of the government.

He was educated at Royal College Colombo. He is the nephew of Rupa Karunathilake.

See also
List of political families in Sri Lanka

References & External links

Biographies of Member of Parliament

Cabinet ministers of Sri Lanka
Samagi Jana Balawegaya politicians
United National Party politicians
Sri Lankan Buddhists
Alumni of Royal College, Colombo
Members of the 11th Parliament of Sri Lanka
Members of the 12th Parliament of Sri Lanka
Members of the 13th Parliament of Sri Lanka
Members of the 14th Parliament of Sri Lanka
Members of the 15th Parliament of Sri Lanka
Members of the 16th Parliament of Sri Lanka
Living people
1962 births
People from Galle
Chief Government Whips (Sri Lanka)
Sinhalese politicians